
Walter Enneccerus (21 November 1911 – 3 August 1971) was an officer in the Luftwaffe during World War II and a recipient of the Knight's Cross of the Iron Cross.

Awards and decorations

 Knight's Cross of the Iron Cross on 21 July 1940 as Hauptmann and Gruppenkommandeur of the II./Sturzkampfgeschwader 2 "Immelmann"

References

Citations

Bibliography

 
 
 
 
 
 
 
 
 
 
 
 
 
 
 
 
 
 
 
 
 
 
 
 
 
 
 
 
 
 
 
 
 
 
 
 
 
 

1911 births
1971 deaths
Military personnel from Trier
German World War II pilots
Bundeswehr generals
Condor Legion personnel
Luftwaffe pilots
Recipients of the Knight's Cross of the Iron Cross
People from the Rhine Province
Brigadier generals of the German Air Force